Dorothy Delasin (born August 26, 1980) is a Filipino-American professional golfer on the LPGA Tour.

Delasin was born in Lubbock, Texas. She grew up in San Francisco, California, where, as a student at Washington High, she won the boys' golf championship (the girls didn't have teams, so Delasin competed against the boys). She had dual American and Filipino citizenship but gave it up sometime before 1999. Delasin won both the U.S. Girls' Junior, in 1996, and the U.S. Women's Amateur, in 1999.

Delasin has four career LPGA titles including the 2001 Samsung World Championship.

On January 20, 2008, Delasin and Jennifer Rosales of Team Philippines won the 4th Women's World Cup of Golf in Sun City, South Africa, with 4 birdies in the last 4 holes. The duo had a final round of 7-under-par 65 in the best ball, for a 54-hole aggregate of 18-under-par 198. Korea's Ji-Yai Shin and Eun Hee Ji were second on 200 after a final round 67, while Taiwan (Amy Hung and Yun Jye Wei) and Japan (Shinobu Moromizato and Miki Saiki) tied for third on 203. France's Gwladys Nocera and Virginie Lagoutte-Clement, were fifth on 205 following 67.

Amateur wins (5)
1996 California State Women's Championship, U.S. Girls' Junior
1997 Southeast Asia Games (team and individual)
1998 Junior World Golf Championships (Girls 15-17)
1999 U.S. Women's Amateur

Professional wins (5)

LPGA Tour wins (4)

LPGA Tour playoff record (2–0)

Other wins (1)
2008 Women's World Cup of Golf (with Jennifer Rosales)

Team appearances
Amateur
Espirito Santo Trophy (representing the Philippines): 1996, 1998

Professional
World Cup (representing the Philippines): 2005, 2006, 2008 (winners)

References

External links

American female golfers
LPGA Tour golfers
Winners of ladies' major amateur golf championships
Asian Games medalists in golf
Asian Games bronze medalists for the Philippines
Golfers at the 1998 Asian Games
Medalists at the 1998 Asian Games
Golfers from Texas
Golfers from San Francisco
American sportspeople of Filipino descent
Sportspeople from Lubbock, Texas
1980 births
Living people
21st-century American women